Yeraskhahun (until 1950, Kuru-Araz) is a village in the Armavir Province of Armenia. Half of the population (around 930) of the village are Yazidis.

See also 
Armavir Province

References 
 
 World Gazeteer: Armenia – World-Gazetteer.com
 
 
 

Populated places in Armavir Province
Populated places established in 1920
Yazidi villages
Yazidi populated places in Armenia